The Planet That Wasn't is a collection of seventeen scientific essays by American writer and scientist Isaac Asimov. It was the twelfth of a series of books collecting essays from The Magazine of Fantasy and Science Fiction. These essays were first published between December 1974 and April 1976. It was first published by Doubleday & Company in 1976.

Contents

"Star In The East" (F&SF, December 1974)
"Thinking About Thinking" (January 1975)
"The Rocketing Dutchmen" (February 1975)
"The Bridge of the Gods" (March 1975)
"The Judo Argument" (April 1975)
"The Planet That Wasn't" (May 1975)
"The Olympian Snows" (June 1975)
"Titanic Surprise" (July 1975)
"The Wicked Witch is Dead" (August 1975)
"The Wrong Turning" (September 1975)
"The Third Liquid" (October 1975)
"Best Foot Backward" (November 1975)
"The Smell of Electricity" (December 1975)
"Silent Victory" (January 1976)
"Change of Air" (February 1976)
"The Nightfall Effect" (March 1976)
"All Gall" (April 1976)

External links
Asimovonline.com
The Planet That Wasn't at Goodreads.com

Essay collections by Isaac Asimov
1976 books
Works originally published in The Magazine of Fantasy & Science Fiction
Doubleday (publisher) books